The Battle of Rovine took place on 17 May 1395. The Wallachian army led by Voivod Mircea the Elder opposed the Ottoman invasion personally led by Sultan Bayezid I the Thunderbolt. The Turkish force heavily outnumbered the Wallachian troops. The legend says that on the eve of the battle, dressed as a peace emissary, Mircea cel Bătrân talked to Bayezid asking him to leave Wallachia and promising him safe passage back. The Sultan proudly insisted on fighting.

Battle 
The battle took place probably near the Argeș River, but the exact location is disputed. The Wallachian victory is confirmed by numerous sources and historians.

During the battle, a key tactical role was played by the Wallachian archers who severely depleted the Ottoman ranks during their initial attack. Bayezid's vassals, the Serbian lords Stefan Lazarević and Marko Mrnjavčević, two of the greatest knights of the time, participated and fought bravely; Stefan showed great courage, Marko was killed in action.

An alternative historical view is that the dramatic confrontation lasted not just a single day, but an entire week, being in the first stage a war of positions. The fierce battle ended with heavy casualties for both sides, eventually each army withdrawing from the battlefield. Although Wallachians pushed back the enemy, the Ottomans were able to defend their resulting position relying on the personal guard of the Sultan composed of Janissaries. This was the impregnable position of the Ottoman defense a year later, in the famous Battle of Nicopolis. This tactical innovation became a fundamental element of the Ottoman war strategies until the 18th century. The army of Mircea, sustaining heavy casualties, and unable to break the defense of the Sultan's camp, was finally obliged to withdraw. Because the Ottoman Empire was not able to conquer Wallachia at this time, Rovine remains one of the most important battles in Romanian history.

An epic description of the confrontation is presented in the poem "Scrisoarea a III-a" (The Third Letter) written by the Romanian national poet, Mihai Eminescu. The Dečani chronicle describes the battle and reports that Prince Marko and Constantine Dragaš died fighting. The same source mentions that Marko's brother, Andreja Mrnjavčević, also perished during the fight.

References

Sources

1395 in Europe
Conflicts in 1395
Battles involving the Ottoman Empire
Battles involving Wallachia
Battles involving Serbia in the Middle Ages
1395 in the Ottoman Empire
14th century in Serbia